Lost Girls or Lost Girl may refer to:

Film and television
 Lost Girls (film), a 2020 American drama mystery film
 The Lost Girls (film), an upcoming adaptation of the novel by Laurie Fox
 Lost Girl, a 2010–2015 Canadian supernatural crime drama TV series
 "Lost Girls" (The Vampire Diaries), a 2009 episode of The Vampire Diaries
 "The Lost Girls" (CSI: Crime Scene Investigation), a 2009 episode of CSI
 "Lost Girl" (Once Upon a Time), a 2013 episode of Once Upon a Time
 "The Lost Girls", a 1999 episode of Daria

Literature
 The Lost Girl, a 1920 novel by D. H. Lawrence
 The Lost Girl (Kwaymullina book), 2014 picture book by Ambellin Kwaymullina
 Lost Girls (graphic novel), a 2006 graphic novel by Alan Moore and Melinda Gebbie
 Lost Girl (novel), a 2015 novel by Adam Nevill
 Lost Girls (non-fiction book), a 2012 crime documentary by Caitlin Rother
 Attack on Titan: Lost Girls, a 2015 Japanese novel by Hiroshi Seko
 Lost Girls, a 2015 novel by Angela Marsons
 Lost Girls, a 1998 novelette by Jane Yolen
 The Lost Girls, a 2003 novel by Laurie Fox based on Peter Pan

Music
 Lost Girls (band), a band formed in 1998 by Patrick Fitzgerald and Heidi Berry
 Lost Girls (album), a 2019 album by Bat for Lashes
 "Lost Girls", a 2017 music video by Lindsey Stirling
 Lost Girls, a 2018 project of Jenny Hval
 "Lost Girl", a 2021 track by Toby Fox from Deltarune Chapter 2 OST from the video game Deltarune

See also 

 Girls Lost (film) (2015)
 Lost Boys (disambiguation)
  or 
  or